The Angeles National Forest Fire Lookout Association ("ANFFLA") is a non-profit 501(c)(3) organization of citizen volunteers dedicated to the preservation, restoration and operation of the fire lookout towers in the Angeles National Forest, Los Angeles County, and other Southern California areas. The organization works in partnership with the federal, state, county and city agencies to meet these goals.

The Association was founded in 1998 by Pam and George Morey and several other members as an offshoot of the San Bernardino National Forest Association.

Purpose
 Restore, maintain and staff the remaining lookouts of the Angeles National Forest.
 The Association serves an additional role in that the volunteers are trained fire lookouts to call in smoke and fire reports thus enhancing the fire fighting capabilities of the U.S. Forest Service.
 Interpret the natural and cultural history of the fire lookouts and the surrounding area for forest visitors.
 Encourage visitors to participate actively in caring for all of our National Forests
 Generate interest in and support for the fire lookout program

Objectives
 Staff and maintain fire lookout towers of the Angeles National Forest and nearby Southern California area.
 Assist the Angeles National Forest Dispatch/Fire Suppression Staff by providing radio relay, accurate smoke reports and remote eyes and ears for incident assessment as needed
 Assist the Angeles National Forest Fire Prevention Staff through interpretive delivery of key fire prevention messages and hands-on experience with the Osborne Fire Finder and related devices
 Assist the Angeles National Forest Recreation Staff by providing general recreation information
 Assist the Angeles National Forest by greeting visitors, and providing general forest orientation, information and assistance
 Provide informal and impromptu interpretation of the surrounding area both cultural and historical
 Create a positive image for the U.S. Forest Service, Angeles National Forest Fire Lookout Association, volunteers, partners and sponsors

Fire lookout towers

Membership

The association is open to all people, aged 18 or older. They must attend required training to join, and attend a "re-up" session once a year usually held in the Spring before the start of the fire season.

Training
All new members are required to attend 3 instructional classes consisting of "Introduction", "Interpretation", and "Operations" in order to be a member. To be a qualified fire lookout, one must also attend an "in-tower"  training class at the lookout tower of their choice. In order to be qualified for more than one tower, the applicant must attend an "in-tower" training at each of the towers.
Each year, returning members must attend a yearly "re-up" session.

Meetings
Monthly meetings are held each month are known as "super sessions" where safety, operational, and other administrative information is disseminated. The meetings begins with a potluck dinner and end with a talk or presentation by a guest speaker or fellow member.

References

External links
 
 
 

Angeles National Forest
San Gabriel Mountains
Firefighters associations in the United States
Firefighting in California
Fire lookout towers in California
Organizations based in Los Angeles County, California
Non-profit organizations based in California
1998 establishments in California
Environmental organizations established in 1998
Wildfire suppression agencies